This is an incomplete list of the paintings by the Belgian painter James Ensor (1860–1949)

References

 Article based on a translation of the equivalent French article

Ensor,James
Paintings by James Ensor